Swimming at the 2023 World Aquatics Championships will be held from 23 to 30 July 2023.

Schedule
42 events will be held.

All times are local (UTC+9).

Medal summary

Medal table

Men

Women

Mixed events

References

External links
 Official website

 
2023 World Aquatics Championships
Swimming at the World Aquatics Championships
2023 in swimming
Swimming competitions in Japan